A walnut is the edible seed of any tree of the genus Juglans (family Juglandaceae), particularly the Persian or English walnut, Juglans regia. The fruits of trees in the (family Juglandaceae) are often confused with drupes. Still, they are accessory fruit because the outer covering of the fruit is technically an involucre and thus not morphologically part of the carpel; this means it cannot be a drupe but is instead a drupe-like nut.

Although culinarily considered a "nut" and used as such, it is not a true botanical nut. After full ripening, the shell is discarded, and the kernel is eaten. Nuts of the eastern black walnut (Juglans nigra) and butternuts (Juglans cinerea) are less commonly consumed.

Characteristics 
Walnuts are rounded, single-seeded stone fruits of the walnut tree commonly used for food after fully ripening between September and November, in which the removal of the husk at this stage reveals a browning wrinkly walnut shell, which is usually commercially found in two segments (three or four-segment shells can also form). During the ripening process, the husk will become brittle and the shell hard.  The shell encloses the kernel or meat, which is usually made up of two halves separated by a membranous partition. The seed kernels – commonly available as shelled walnuts – are enclosed in a brown seed coat which contains antioxidants. The antioxidants protect the oil-rich seed from atmospheric oxygen, thereby preventing rancidity. 

Walnut trees are late to grow leaves, typically not leafing out until more than halfway through the spring. They emit chemicals into the soil to prevent competing vegetation from growing. Because of this, susceptible plants should not be planted close to them.

History and cultivation 
During the Byzantine era, the walnut was also known by the name "royal nut". An article on walnut tree cultivation in Spain is included in Ibn al-'Awwam's 12th-century Book on Agriculture.

Types 
The two most common major species of walnuts are grown for their seeds – the Persian or English walnut and the black walnut. The English walnut (J. regia) originated in Iran (Persia), and the black walnut (J. nigra) is native to eastern North America. The black walnut is of strong flavor, but due to its hard shell and poor hulling characteristics, it is not commercially cultivated in orchards.

Numerous walnut cultivars have been developed commercially, which are nearly all hybrids of the English walnut.

Other species include J. californica, the California black walnut (often used as a rootstock for commercial propagation of J. regia), J. cinerea (butternuts), and J. major, the Arizona walnut. Other sources list J. californica californica as native to southern California, and Juglans californica hindsii, or just J. hindsii, as native to northern California; in at least one case, these are given as "geographic variants" instead of subspecies (Botanica).

Production 

In 2020, world production of walnuts (in shell) was 3.3 million tonnes, with China contributing 33% of the total (table). Other major producers (in the order of decreasing harvest) were the United States, Iran, and Turkey.

Storage 
Walnuts, like other tree nuts, must be processed and stored properly. Poor storage makes walnuts susceptible to insect and fungal mold infestations; the latter produces aflatoxin – a potent carcinogen. A batch that contains mold-infested walnuts should be entirely discarded.

However, such refrigeration technologies are unavailable in developing countries where walnuts are produced in large quantities; walnuts are best stored below  with low humidity. Temperatures above  and humidities above 70 percent can lead to rapid and high spoilage losses. Above 75 percent humidity threshold, fungal molds that release dangerous aflatoxin can form.

Food use 

Walnut meats are available in two forms: in their shells or de-shelled. Due to processing, the meats may be whole, halved, or in smaller portions. All walnuts can be eaten on their own (raw, toasted, or pickled), or as part of a mix such as muesli, or as an ingredient of a dish: e.g. walnut soup, walnut pie, walnut coffee cake, banana cake, brownie, fudge. Walnuts are often candied or pickled. Pickled walnuts that are the whole fruit can be savory or sweet depending on the preserving solution. 

Walnuts may be used as an ingredient in other foodstuffs. Walnut is an important ingredient in baklava, Circassian chicken, chicken in walnut sauce, and poultry or meat ball stew from Iranian cuisine.

Walnuts are also popular as an ice cream topping, and walnut pieces are used as a garnish on some foods. 

Nocino is a liqueur made from unripe green walnuts steeped in alcohol with syrup added.

Walnut oil is available commercially and is chiefly used as a food ingredient, particularly in salad dressings. It has a low smoke point, which limits its use for frying.

Nutritional value 

Walnuts without shells are 4% water, 15% protein, 65% fat, and 14% carbohydrates, including 7% dietary fiber (table). In a 100-gram reference serving, walnuts provide  and rich content (20% or more of the Daily Value or DV) of several dietary minerals, particularly manganese at 163% DV, and B vitamins (table).

While English walnuts are the most commonly consumed, their nutrient density and profile are generally similar to those of black walnuts.

Unlike most nuts, which are high in monounsaturated fatty acids, walnut oil is composed largely of polyunsaturated fatty acids (72% of total fats), particularly alpha-linolenic acid (14%) and linoleic acid (58%), although it does contain oleic acid as 13% of total fats.

Health claims 
The FDA had, in 2004, refused to authorize the claim that "Diets including walnuts can reduce the risk of heart disease" and had sent an FDA Warning Letter to Diamond Foods in 2010 stating there is "not sufficient evidence to identify a biologically active substance in walnuts that reduces the risk of coronary heart disease." A recent systematic review assessing the effect of walnut supplementation on blood pressure (BP) found insufficient evidence to support walnut consumption as a BP-lowering strategy. It has been studied if walnuts may enhance the probability of pregnancy for men with male factor infertility.

As of 2021, the relationship between walnuts and cognitive health is inconclusive.

Non-food applications 
Juice from boiled walnuts can be used as an antifungal agent. Green husks can be crushed and sprinkled into the water to poison fish.

Folk medicine 
Walnuts have been listed as one of the 38 substances used to prepare Bach flower remedies, a herbal remedy promoted in folk medicine practices for its supposed effect on health. According to Cancer Research UK, "there is no scientific evidence to prove that flower remedies can control, cure or prevent any type of disease, including cancer".

Inks and dyes 

Walnut husks can be used to make durable ink for writing and drawing. It is thought to have been used by artists including Leonardo da Vinci and Rembrandt.

Walnut husk pigments are used as a brown dye for fabric and were used in classical Rome and medieval Europe for dyeing hair.

Woodworking
The fine, straight-grained wood of the black walnut is highly valued as a furniture wood, wall paneling, automobile interiors, and for gunstocks.

Cleaning 
The United States Army once used ground walnut shells for abrasive blasting to clean aviation parts because of low cost and low abrasive qualities. However, an investigation of a fatal Boeing CH-47 Chinook helicopter crash (11 September 1982, in Mannheim, Germany) revealed that walnut shell grit had clogged an oil port, leading to the accident and the discontinuation of walnut shells as a cleaning agent. Commercially, crushed walnut shells are still used outside of aviation for low-abrasive, less-toxic cleaning and blasting applications.

Phytochemicals 
Walnut hulls contain diverse phytochemicals, such as polyphenols, that stain hands and can cause skin irritation. Seven phenolic compounds, including ferulic acid, vanillic acid, coumaric acid, syringic acid, myricetin, and juglone were identified in walnut husks. Juglone, the predominant phenolic, was found in concentrations of 2-4% fresh weight.

Walnuts also contain the ellagitannin pedunculagin. Regiolone has been isolated with juglone, betulinic acid and sitosterol from the stem bark of J. regia.

Chinese culture 
Large, symmetrically shaped, and sometimes intricately carved walnut shells (mainly from J. hopeiensis ) are valued collectibles in China where they are rotated in hand as a plaything or as decoration. They are also an investment and status symbol, with some carvings having high monetary value if unique. Pairs of walnuts are sometimes sold in their green husks for a form of gambling known as du qing pi.

Cultivars

Gallery

References

Further reading

External links 

 

Crops
Edible nuts and seeds
Fruit trees
 
Plant dyes
Symbols of California